Anita Renee Cockerham (born February 6, 1967), known professionally as Anita Cochran, is an American country music singer, songwriter, and guitarist. She has released two albums for Warner Bros. Records Nashville and one for Straybranch Records. Cochran is best known for her late 1997-early 1998 single "What If I Said", a duet with Steve Wariner that reached the number-one position on the Billboard Hot Country Songs charts.

Biography
Anita Cochran was born in South Lyon, Michigan, into a family that enjoyed listening to country music. She began to play guitar at an early age, and later learned to play banjo, mandolin and Dobro as well. A local country musician, Anita's father often took her to country music festivals. She later found work both in bands and as a solo act, and was eventually hired to manage Pearl Recording Studios, a studio in Canton, Michigan.

In 1997, after moving to Nashville, Tennessee, she was signed to Warner Bros. Records. Released in 1997, her debut album, Back to You, was produced by her as well. She co-wrote all but one of the album's songs and played several instruments on it. The album's lead-off single, "I Could Love a Man Like That", peaked at No. 64, followed by the No. 69 "Daddy, Can You See Me". The third single, a duet with Steve Wariner titled "What If I Said", reached the top of the U.S. Billboard Hot Country Singles & Tracks charts in early 1998. Following this song was the album's fourth and final single, "Will You Be Here?" also at No. 69. Her second album, Anita, produced three singles, all of which failed to reach the top 40.

For the first single from her third album, God Created Woman, Cochran spliced in Conway Twitty's vocals from earlier songs of his to form a duet entitled "(I Wanna Hear) A Cheatin' Song". This song peaked at No. 57; the album was never released.

In 2007, Cochran produced country music singer Tammy Cochran's album Where I Am. The two singers are not related.

Cochran was diagnosed with breast cancer in late 2017. In 2018, several artists gathered to hold a benefit concert for her.

Discography

Studio albums

Singles

Music Videos

References

1967 births
American country guitarists
American country singer-songwriters
American women country singers
American country record producers
Resonator guitarists
Living people
American mandolinists
People from South Lyon, Michigan
Country musicians from Michigan
Singer-songwriters from Michigan
Guitarists from Michigan
20th-century American guitarists
American women record producers
20th-century American women guitarists
21st-century American women